= Global Vision Cancer Care NGO =

Indian non-governmental organization

Global Vision is a non-governmental organization (NGO) that supports poor cancer patients in India. Based in Thane, it helps needy cancer patients medically and financially. It was founded in 2009.

== Activities ==
=== Cancer Awareness Rally ===
On the occasion of World Cancer day, they conducted a cancer awareness rally that took place in the city of Bangalore.

=== Fund Raising ===
They organized an event “UMEED – 5 “A BETTER HOPE FOR TOMORROW” to raise funds for cancer patients. The donation of '35 lakhs were distributed to the patients. During the event, Global Vision awarded the successes of people from various fields.
